The Mary Peary Peaks are a mountain in the Roosevelt Range, Peary Land, Northern Greenland. Administratively they belong to the Northeast Greenland National Park.

The peaks were named by Robert Peary after his mother, Mary Peary (1827 – 1900). Peary saw the mountain from a distance, in the vicinity of Constable Bay, as he traveled along the shore. He marked it in his map but did not go inland to explore the features of the range.

Geography
The Mary Peary Peaks are located in the middle sector of the Roosevelt Range east of the Polar Corridor in a roughly central position to the west of the western end of the H. H. Benedict Range. According to the A-5 sheet of the Defense Mapping Agency Navigation chart it is a  summit.

The Sif Glacier originates in the ice cap of the Mary Peary Peaks. It flows in a WSW/ENE direction bifurcating south of the Birgit Koch Peaks with one arm flowing roughly northwards and another southwards.

See also
List of mountains in Greenland
Peary Land

References

External links
The women in Peary's life, part 1 mother” - Taissumani
North America, Greenland, Roosevelt Range, J.V. Jensen Land, Avanarsuasua, Exploration

Mountains of Greenland
Roosevelt Range